Huanghua Town is a town in Changsha County, Changsha, Hunan province, China. It contains three communities and 20 villages.
It is the location of Changsha Huanghua International Airport.

Divisions of Changsha County
Changsha County